Clower is a surname, occupational for a nailer. Notable people with the surname include:

Jerry Clower (1926–1998), American comedian
Robert W. Clower (1926–2011), American economist

See also
 Clowers

References

English-language surnames
Occupational surnames